The 2019–20 Louisville Cardinals women's basketball team represented the University of Louisville during the 2019–20 NCAA Division I women's basketball season. The Cardinals, were led by 13th-year head coach Jeff Walz, and played their home games at the KFC Yum! Center in their sixth year in the Atlantic Coast Conference.

The Cardinals finished the season 28–4 and 16–2 in ACC play.  They finished as the regular season ACC champions and earned the first seed in the ACC tournament.  They defeated Syracuse in the Quarterfinals before losing to eventual champions NC State in the Semifinals.  The NCAA tournament was cancelled due to the COVID-19 outbreak.

Previous season
The Cardinals finished the 2018–19 season at 32–4, 14–2 in ACC play to finish in a tie for first place. They advanced to the championship game of the ACC women's tournament where they lost to Notre Dame. They received an at-large for the NCAA women's tournament as a number one seed in the Albany Region. In the tournament, they defeated Robert Morris and Michigan in the first and second rounds, Oregon State in the sweet sixteen before losing to Connecticut in the elite eight.

Off-season

Recruiting Class

Source:

Roster

Rankings

Coaches did not release a Week 2 poll and AP does not release a final poll.  Due to the cancellation of the NCAA Tournament, the coaches poll did not release a final ranking.

Schedule and results

Source

|-
!colspan=9 style=| Exhibition

|-
!colspan=9 style=| Regular season

|-
!colspan=9 style=| ACC Women's Tournament

References

Louisville Cardinals women's basketball seasons
Louisville
Louisville Cardinals women's basketball, 2019-20
Louisville Cardinals women's basketball, 2019-20